Via Zanardi 33 is an Italian television series.

Cast
Dino Abbrescia: Stefano
Alessandra Bertin: Fra
Ginevra Colonna: Bea
Sarah Felberbaum: Lucia
Elio Germano: Ivan
Antonia Liskova: Anneke
Enrico Silvestrin: Mattia
Patrizio Pelizzi: Gianni

See also
List of Italian television series

External links
 

Italian television series
2001 Italian television series debuts
2001 Italian television series endings
2000s Italian television series
Italia 1 original programming